Hugo Ronald Alan Spowers  (born 1960) is a British entrepreneur-engineer who co-ordinated the development of the Morgan LIFEcar sports car project that was launched at the Geneva Motor Show in March 2008, and the Riversimple Urban Car.

Spowers is the founder of Riversimple (formerly known as OSCar), the company that co-ordinated the design of LIFECar, and is currently developing the Riversimple Urban Car, a viable hydrogen fuel cell car for urban use. Spowers is a graduate of the University of Oxford, and Cranfield University.

Whilst an undergraduate at Oxford University in the late seventies and early eighties, Spowers was an active member of the extreme sports society, the Dangerous Sports Club.

Spowers was appointed Member of the Order of the British Empire (MBE) in the 2022 Birthday Honours for services to technology.

Footnotes

External links
 RiverSimple Company Website + Blog

References 
-	Times Online	 
-	Authentic Business	 
-	Article for Vanity Fair	 
-	The Telegraph	 
-	Times Online

British automotive engineers
Living people
1960 births
Articles containing video clips
Members of the Order of the British Empire